Protected areas of Brazil included various classes of area according to the National System of Conservation Units (SNUC), a formal, unified system for federal, state and municipal parks created in 2000.

Types of protected area

Protected areas, also called conservation units, are divided into different categories according to their goals.
These are defined by Law No. 9.985 of 18 July 2000, which established the National System of Conservation Units (SNUC).
Objectives include conservation of nature, sustainable development, scientific research, education and eco-tourism.
Fully protected units are expected to maintain the natural ecosystem without human interference.
Sustainable use units allow sustained use of renewable environmental resources while maintaining biodiversity and other ecological attributes.
The Chico Mendes Institute for Biodiversity Conservation, which administers Federal units, defines the fully protected (proteção integral) classes of unit as:

Ecological stations
Biological reserves
National parks, State parks and Municipal nature parks
Natural monuments
Wildlife refuges

The sustainable use units are:

Environmental protection areas
Areas of relevant ecological interest
National forests and State forests
Extractive reserves
Wildlife reserves
Sustainable development reserves
Private natural heritage reserves

In addition, some states designate areas as ecological reserve.

Although not technically protected areas, indigenous territories give the indigenous people full rights over the area, and serve as an obstacle to deforestation, mining and large-scale agriculture. As of 2016 there were 700 Indigenous Territories in Brazil, covering about 13.8%% of the country's land area. 
Most of them were in the Amazon Legal.

Mosaics and corridors

The SNUC law defines a protected area mosaic as a collection of protected areas of the same or different categories that are near to each other, adjoining each other or overlapping, and that should be managed as a whole. 
Given the different categories of conservation unit and other protected areas in a mosaic, the different conservation goals must be considered.
In addition to fully protected and sustainable use conservation units a mosaic may include private lands and indigenous territories.

The SNUC law also recognises ecological corridors as portions of natural or semi-natural ecosystems linking protected areas that allow gene flow and movement of biota, recolonization of degraded areas and maintenance of viable populations larger than would be possible with individual units.
The federal Ecological Corridor Project has its roots at least as far back as 1993.
It has identified seven major corridors, with focus on implementing and learning from the Central Amazon Corridor and the Central Atlantic Forest Corridor.

Degree of coverage

As of 2004 federally-administered conservation units covered 7.23% of Brazilian territory, below the level of 10% recommended by the International Union for Conservation of Nature.
Federal coverage was:

Levels of protection vary considerably depending on the biome. Federal coverage as of 2005 was:

Protected areas are subject to reduction, reclassification or declassification (RRD). 
The main cause was making land available for hydroelectric dams in the Amazon region.
Other reasons were property speculation and agribusiness.

See also 
 List of ecoregions in Brazil

References

Sources